The 2021 BYU Cougars women's volleyball team represents Brigham Young University in the 2021 NCAA Division I women's volleyball season. The Cougars are led by seventh year head coach Heather Olmstead and play their home games at the Smith Fieldhouse. The Cougars are members of the WCC.

BYU comes off a season where they finished first and won the WCC regular season championship. The Cougars received an automatic big to the NCAA tournament falling to Wisconsin.

Season highlights
Will be filled in as the season progresses.

Roster

Schedule

 *-Indicates Conference Opponent
 y-Indicates NCAA Playoffs
 Times listed are Mountain Time Zone.

Announcers for televised games
All home games will be on BYUtv or the BYUtv App. Most road games will also be televised or streamed on WCC Network, with the game at Pitt on ACC Network Extra, Utah Valley on ESPN+, and the other two Panther Classic matches being untelevised. 
Southern Utah: Jarom Jordan, Amy Gant, & Kiki Solano
LIU: Jarom Jordan & Amy Gant
UNLV: Jarom Jordan, Amy Gant, & Kiki Solano
Weber State: Jarom Jordan, Amy Gant, & Kiki Solano
Dixie State: Jason Shepherd & Amy Gant
Michigan State: Brandon Crow & Amy Gant
Pitt: Josh Rowntree & Amanda Silay
Utah: Jarom Jordan, Amy Gant, & Kiki Solano
Utah Valley: Matt Baiamonte & Madison Dennison
Pacific: Jarom Jordan & Amy Gant
Saint Mary's: Jarom Jordan, Amy Gant, & Kiki Solano
Santa Clara: Anthony Passarelli
San Francisco: Joaquin Wallace
Portland: Spencer Linton, Amy Gant, & Kiki Solano 
Gonzaga: Jarom Jordan, Amy Gant, & Kiki Solano
Loyola Marymount: Jonathan Grace & Joely Karrer
Pepperdine: Al Epstein
San Diego: Jarom Jordan, Amy Gant, & Kiki Solano
San Francisco: Jarom Jordan, Amy Gant, & Kiki Solano
Santa Clara: Jarom Jordan, Amy Gant, & Kiki Solano
Gonzaga: Thomas Gallagher & Bella Fontaine
Portland: Bryan Sleik & Carly Dumanon
Pepperdine: Jarom Jordan, Amy Gant, & Kiki Solano
Loyola Marymount: Jarom Jordan, Amy Gant, & Kiki Solano
Pacific: Paul Muyskens &  Carmelo DeLa Fuente
Saint Mary's: Ben Ross
San Diego: Jack Cronin
Boise State: Jarom Jordan & Amy Gant
Utah: Jarom Jordan & Amy Gant
Purdue: Alex Loeb & Missy Whittemore

References
For information on BYU's other athletic sports this season please check out the following:

2021 team
2021 in sports in Utah
BYU
BYU